The following are the national records in athletics in Kuwait maintained by Kuwait Amateur Athletic Federation (KAAF).

Outdoor

Key to tables:

+ = en route to a longer distance

h = hand timing

NWI = no wind information

OT = oversized track

Men

Women

Indoor

Men

Women

Notes

References
General
World Athletics Statistic Handbook 2022: National Outdoor Records
World Athletics Statistic Handbook 2022: National Indoor Records
Specific

External links

Kuwait
Records
Athletics
Athletics